General Sir Harry Hugh Sidney Knox  (5 November 1873 – 10 June 1971) is a former Adjutant-General to the Forces.

Military career
Educated at St. Columba's College, Harry Knox was commissioned into the Northamptonshire Regiment on 9 September 1893, and promoted to the rank of lieutenant on 26 August 1895. He served on the North-West Frontier between 1897 and 1898, where he took part in the Tirah Campaign, including operations on the Samana Range, the capture of the Sampagha Pass and Arhanga Pass (October 1897), and operations in the Bara valley (December 1897). In January 1900, he was seconded for service under the Foreign Office, and attached to the Uganda Rifles. He returned to regular service with his regiment in March 1902, and was promoted to the rank of captain on 1 April 1902. The following month he was appointed Adjutant of the 1st Battalion.

Knox fought in the First World War, and was involved in the British Expeditionary Force. He was made an officer of the Legion of Honour in February 1916. He was awarded the Distinguished Service Order (DSO) in 1917 and Companion of the Order of the Bath in 1919. For his war service he was made an Officer of the Belgian Order of the Crown; he received permission to wear his decoration from 7 February 1921.

After the War he became a Colonel at the Staff College, Camberley. He then became Commander of 3rd Brigade in 1923. He was appointed Director of Military Training at the War Office in 1926 and then became General Officer Commanding of the 3rd Division in 1930. On 20 September 1933 he was appointed Lieutenant of the Tower of London.

In the 1935 New Year Honours he was awarded Knight Commander of the Order of the Bath. He served as Adjutant-General to the Forces between 1935 and 1937.

In retirement he was Governor of the Royal Hospital Chelsea from 1938 to 1943.

Family
He married Grace Una Storrs.

References

|-
 

|-

 

1873 births
1971 deaths
Military personnel from County Down
British Army personnel of World War I
British Army generals
Knights Commander of the Order of the Bath
Northamptonshire Regiment officers
Officiers of the Légion d'honneur
Officers of the Order of the Crown (Belgium)
Companions of the Distinguished Service Order
Lieutenants of the Tower of London